4 Bourdillon is one of the tallest residential buildings in West Africa. It is located on the corner of Bourdillon and Thompson Road, Ikoyi, Lagos. It is a Twin Tower of 25 Floors comprising 41 apartments (Flats, Duplex Flats and Duplex Penthouses). The 41 Units have 3 and 4 Bedroom Flats and 5-Bedroom Duplex Flats and Duplex Penthouses.

The building's other features include greenery, water-bodies, swimming pools, tennis court, gym and clubhouse with underground parking. It's penthouses have roof gardens and curved balconies. It's glazed balustrade allows a 360-degree view of Lagos Island.

The building was designed by architects Design Group Nigeria, P&T group and developed by Kaizen Properties and El-Alan Group. El-Alan was also  the main contractor. Construction started in 2015 and completed in early 2020.

See also
List of tallest buildings in Nigeria

References

External links
  Official website

 Skyscraperpage

Residential skyscrapers in Lagos
Residential buildings completed in 2020
Twin towers
Modernist architecture in Nigeria
21st-century architecture in Nigeria